Aleksandra Sošenko (born 15 January 1991) is a Lithuanian racing cyclist.

Major achievements

Road cycling 

2010
3rd, Lithuanian National Time Trial Championships
2011
3rd, Puchar Prezesa LZS
3rd, Lithuanian National Time Trial Championships
, Universiade, Women team time trial

Track cycling 

2009
, World Championships, Junior Women's Scratch

References

External links
 

1991 births
Living people
Lithuanian female cyclists
Lithuanian track cyclists
Sportspeople from Vilnius
Universiade medalists in cycling
Universiade gold medalists for Lithuania
Medalists at the 2011 Summer Universiade